The Platform Controller Hub (PCH) is a family of Intel's single-chip chipsets, first introduced in 2009. It is the successor to the Intel Hub Architecture, which used two chipsa northbridge and southbridge, and first appeared in the Intel 5 Series.

The PCH controls certain data paths and support functions used in conjunction with Intel CPUs. These include clocking (the system clock), Flexible Display Interface (FDI) and Direct Media Interface (DMI), although FDI is used only when the chipset is required to support a processor with integrated graphics. As such, I/O functions are reassigned between this new central hub and the CPU compared to the previous architecture: some northbridge functions, the memory controller and PCIe lanes, were integrated into the CPU while the PCH took over the remaining functions in addition to the traditional roles of the southbridge. AMD has its equivalent for the PCH, known simply as a chipset, no longer using the previous term Fusion controller hub since the release of the Zen architecture in 2017.

Overview

The PCH architecture supersedes Intel's previous Hub Architecture, with its design addressing the eventual problematic performance bottleneck between the processor and the motherboard. Over time, the speed of CPUs kept increasing but the bandwidth of the front-side bus (FSB) (connection between the CPU and the motherboard) did not, resulting in a performance bottleneck.

Under the Hub Architecture, a motherboard would have a two piece chipset consisting of a northbridge chip and a southbridge chip. As a solution to the bottleneck, several functions belonging to the traditional northbridge and southbridge chipsets were rearranged. The northbridge and its functions are now eliminated completely: The memory controller, PCI Express lanes for expansion cards and other northbridge functions are now incorporated into the CPU die as a system agent (Intel) or packaged in the processor on an I/O die (AMD Zen 2).

The PCH then incorporates a few of the remaining northbridge functions (e.g. clocking) in addition to all of the southbridge's functions, replacing it. The system clock was previously a connection and is now incorporated into the PCH. Two different connections exist between the PCH and the CPU: Flexible Display Interface (FDI) and Direct Media Interface (DMI). The FDI is used only when the chipset requires supporting a processor with integrated graphics. The Intel Management Engine was also moved to the PCH starting with the Nehalem processors and 5-Series chipsets. AMD's chipsets instead use several PCIe lanes to connect with the CPU while also providing their own PCIe lanes, which are also provided by the processor itself.

With the northbridge functions integrated to the CPU, much of the bandwidth needed for chipsets is now relieved.

This style began in Nehalem and will remain for the foreseeable future, through Cannon Lake.

Phase-out
Beginning with ultra-low-power Broadwells and continuing with mobile Skylake processors, Intel incorporated the southbridge IO controllers into the CPU package, eliminating the PCH for a system in package (SOP) design with two dies; the larger die being the CPU die, the smaller die being the PCH die. Rather than DMI, these SOPs directly expose PCIe lanes, as well as SATA, USB, and HDA lines from integrated controllers, and SPI/I²C/UART/GPIO lines for sensors. Like PCH-compatible CPUs, they continue to expose DisplayPort, RAM, and SMBus lines. However, a fully integrated voltage regulator will be absent until Cannon Lake.

Ibex Peak

The Intel 5 Series chipsets were the first to introduce a PCH. This first PCH is codenamed Ibex Peak.

This has the following variations:
BD3400 (PCH 3400) Server
BD3420 (PCH 3420) Server
BD3450 (PCH 3450) Server
BD82P55 (PCH P55) Desktop Base
BD82H55 (PCH H55) Desktop Home
BD82H57 (PCH H57) Desktop Home
BD82Q57 (PCH Q57) Desktop Office
BD82PM55 (PCH PM55) Mobile Base
BD82HM55 (PCH HM55) Mobile Home
BD82HM57 (PCH HM57) Mobile Home
BD82QM57 (PCH QM57) Mobile Office
BD82QS57 (PCH QS57) Mobile SFF

Issues
Bogus USB ports will be detected by desktop PCHs equipped with 6 USB ports (3420, H55) on the first EHCI controller. This can happen when AC power is removed after entering ACPI S4. Applying AC power back and resuming from S4 may result in non detected or even non functioning USB device (erratum 12)
Bogus USB ports will be detected by mobile PCH equipped with 6 USB ports (HM55) on the first EHCI controller. This can happen when AC power and battery are removed after entering ACPI S4. Applying AC power or battery back and resuming from S4 may result in non detected or even non functioning USB device (erratum 13)
Reading the HPET comparator timer immediately after a write returns the old value (erratum 14)
SATA 6 Gbit/s devices may not be detected at cold boot or after ACPI S3, S4 resume (erratum 21)

Langwell
Langwell is the codename of a PCH in the Moorestown MID/smartphone platform. for Atom Lincroft microprocessors.

This has the following variations:
AF82MP20 (PCH MP20)
AF82MP30 (PCH MP30)

Tiger Point

Tiger Point is the codename of a PCH in the Pine Trail netbook platform chipset for Atom Pineview microprocessors.

This has the following variations:
CG82NM10 (PCH NM10)

Topcliff
Topcliff is the codename of a PCH in the Queens Bay embedded platform chipset for Atom Tunnel Creek microprocessors.

It connects to the processor via PCIe (vs. DMI as other PCHs do).

This has the following variations:
CS82TPCF (PCH EG20T)

Cougar Point

Cougar Point is the codename of a PCH in Intel 6 Series chipsets for mobile, desktop, and workstation / server platforms. It is most closely associated with Sandy Bridge processors.

This has the following variations:
BD82C202 (PCH C202) Server
BD82C204 (PCH C204) Server
BD82C206 (PCH C206) Workstation / Server
BD82P67 (PCH P67) Desktop Base
BD82H67 (PCH H67) Desktop Home
BD82H61 (PCH H61) Desktop Home
BD82Z68 (PCH Z68) Combined desktop base and home
BD82B65 (PCH B65) Desktop Office
BD82Q67 (PCH Q67) Desktop Office
BD82Q65 (PCH Q65) Desktop Office
BD82HM65 (PCH HM65) Mobile Home
BD82HM67 (PCH HM67) Mobile Home
BD82QM67 (PCH QM67) Mobile Office
BD82QS67 (PCH QS67) Mobile SFF
BD82UM67 (PCH UM67) Ultra Mobile

Issues

In the first month after Cougar Point's release, January 2011, Intel posted a press release stating a design error had been discovered. Specifically, a transistor in the 3 Gbit/s PLL clocking tree was receiving too high voltage. The projected result was a 5–15% failure rate within three years of 3 Gbit/s SATA ports, commonly used for storage devices such as hard drives and optical drives. The bug was present in revision B2 of the chipsets, and was fixed with B3. Z68 did not have this bug, since the B2 revision for it was never released. 6 Gbit/s ports were not affected. This bug was especially a problem with the H61 chipset, which only had 3 Gbit/s SATA ports.  Through OEMs, Intel plans to repair or replace all affected products at a cost of $700 million.

Nearly all produced motherboards using Cougar Point chipsets were designed to handle Sandy Bridge, and later Ivy Bridge, processors. ASRock produced one motherboard for LGA 1156 processors, based on P67 chipset, the P67 Transformer. It exclusively supports Lynnfield Core i5/i7 and Xeon processors, using LGA 1156 socket. After revision B2 of Cougar Point chipsets was recalled, ASRock decided not to update the P67 Transformer motherboard, and was discontinued. Some small Chinese manufacturers are producing LGA 1156 motherboards with H61 chipset.

Whitney Point
Whitney Point is the codename of a PCH in the Oak Trail tablet platform for Atom Lincroft microprocessors.

This has the following variations:
82SM35 (PCH SM35)

Panther Point

Panther Point is the codename of a PCH in Intel 7 Series chipsets for mobile and desktop. It is most closely associated with Ivy Bridge processors. These chipsets (except PCH HM75) have integrated USB 3.0.

This has the following variations:
 BD82C216 (PCH C216) Workstation/Server
 BD82H77 (PCH H77) Desktop Home
 BD82Z77 (PCH Z77) Combined desktop base and home
 BD82Z75 (PCH Z75) Combined desktop base and home
 BD82B75 (PCH B75) Desktop Office
 BD82Q77 (PCH Q77) Desktop Office
 BD82Q75 (PCH Q75) Desktop Office
 BD82HM77 (PCH HM77) Mobile Home
 BD82HM76 (PCH HM76) Mobile Home
 BD82HM75 (PCH HM75) Mobile Home
 BD82HM70 (PCH HM70) Mobile Home
 BD82QM77 (PCH QM77) Mobile Office
 BD82QS77 (PCH QS77) Mobile Office
 BD82UM77 (PCH UM77) Ultra Mobile

Cave Creek
Cave Creek is the codename of the PCH most closely associated with Crystal Forest platforms and Gladden or Sandy Bridge-EP/EN processors.
 DH8900 (PCH 8900) Communications
 DH8903 (PCH 8903) Communications
 DH8910 (PCH 8910) Communications
 DH8920 (PCH 8920) Communications

Patsburg
Patsburg is the codename of a PCH in Intel 7 Series chipsets for server and workstation using the LGA 2011 socket. It was initially launched in 2011 as part of Intel X79 for the desktop enthusiast Sandy Bridge-E processors in Waimea Bay platforms. Patsburg was then used for the Sandy Bridge-EP server platform (the platform was codenamed Romley and the CPUs codenamed Jaketown, and finally branded as Xeon E5-2600 series) launched in early 2012.

Launched in the fall of 2013, the Ivy Bridge-E/EP processors (the latter branded as Xeon E5-2600 v2 series) also work with Patsburg, typically with a BIOS update.

Patsburg has the following variations:
BD82C602 (PCH C602) Server
BD82C602J (PCH C602J) Server
BD82C604 (PCH C604) Server
BD82C606 (PCH C606) Workstation / Server
BD82C608 (PCH C608) Workstation / Server
BD82X79 (PCH X79) Workstation

Coleto Creek
Coleto Creek is the codename of the PCH most closely associated with Highland Forest platforms and Ivy Bridge-EP processors.
DH8925 (PCH 8925) Communications
DH8926 (PCH 8926) Communications
DH8950 (PCH 8950) Communications
DH8955 (PCH 8955) Communications

Lynx Point

Lynx Point is the codename of a PCH in Intel 8 Series chipsets, most closely associated with Haswell processors with LGA 1150 socket.  The Lynx Point chipset connects to the processor primarily over the Direct Media Interface (DMI) interface.

The following variants are available:
 DH82C222 (PCH C222) Workstation/Server
 DH82C224 (PCH C224) Workstation/Server
 DH82C226 (PCH C226) Workstation/Server
 DH82H81 (PCH H81) Desktop Home
 DH82H87 (PCH H87) Desktop Home
 DH82Z87 (PCH Z87) Combined desktop base and home
 DH82B85 (PCH B85) Desktop Office
 DH82Q87 (PCH Q87) Desktop Office
 DH82Q85 (PCH Q85) Desktop Office
 DH82HM87 (PCH HM87) Mobile Home
 DH82HM86 (PCH HM86) Mobile Home
 DH82QM87 (PCH QM87) Mobile Office

In addition the following newer variants are available, additionally known as Wildcat Point, which also support Haswell Refresh processors:
 DH82H97 (PCH H97) Desktop Home
 DH82Z97 (PCH Z97) Combined desktop base and home

Issues
A design flaw causes devices connected to the Lynx Point's integrated USB 3.0 controller to be disconnected when the system wakes up from the S3 state (Suspend to RAM), forcing the USB devices to be reconnected although no data is lost.  This issue is corrected in C2 stepping level of the Lynx Point chipset.

Wellsburg 
Wellsburg is the codename for the C610-series PCH, supporting the Haswell-E (Core i7 Extreme), Haswell-EP (Xeon E5-16xx v3 and Xeon E5-26xx v3), and Broadwell-EP (Xeon E5-26xx v4) processors. Generally similar to Patsburg, Wellsburg consumes only up to 7 W when fully loaded.

Wellsburg has the following variations:
 DH82029 (PCH C612), intended for servers and workstations
 DHX99 (PCH X99), intended for enthusiasts making use of Intel Core i7 59/69XX processors but it is compatible with LGA 2011-3  Xeons.

Sunrise Point

Sunrise Point is the codename of a PCH in Intel 100 Series chipsets, most closely associated with Skylake processors with LGA 1151 socket.

The following variants are available:
 GL82C236 (PCH C236) Workstation/Server
 GL82H110 (PCH H110) Desktop Home
 GL82H170 (PCH H170) Desktop Home (Note the datasheet linked one that page is incorrect, see via PCH HM170 below)
 GL82Z170 (PCH Z170) Combined desktop base and home
 GL82B150 (PCH B150) Desktop Office
 GL82Q150 (PCH Q150) Desktop Office
 GL82Q170 (PCH Q170) Desktop Office
 GL82HM170 (PCH HM170) Mobile Home
 GL82CM236 (PCH CM236) Mobile Workstation
 GL82QM170 (PCH QM170) Mobile Office

Union Point

Union Point is the codename of a PCH in Intel 200 Series chipsets, most closely associated with Kaby Lake processors with LGA 1151 socket.

The following variants are available:
 GL82H270 (PCH H270) Desktop Home
 GL82Z270 (PCH Z270) Combined desktop base and home
 GL82B250 (PCH B250) Desktop Office
 GL82Q250 (PCH Q250) Desktop Office
 GL82Q270 (PCH Q270) Desktop Office

Lewisburg 
Lewisburg is the codename for the C620-series PCH, supporting LGA 2066 socketed Skylake-X/Kaby Lake-X processors ("Skylake-W" Xeon).

Lewisburg has the following variations:
 EY82C621 (PCH C621), intended for servers and workstations
 EY82C622 (PCH C622), intended for servers and workstations
 EY82C624 (PCH C624), intended for servers and workstations
 EY82C625 (PCH C625), intended for servers and workstations
 EY82C626 (PCH C626), intended for servers and workstations
 EY82C627 (PCH C627), intended for servers and workstations
 EY82C628 (PCH C628), intended for servers and workstations

Basin Falls 
Basin Falls is the codename for the C400-series PCH, supporting Skylake-X/Kaby Lake-X processors (branded Core i9 Extreme and "Skylake-W" Xeon). Generally similar to Wellsburg, Basin Falls consumes only up to 6 W when fully loaded.

Basin Falls has the following variations:
 GL82C422 (PCH C422), intended for servers and workstations
 GL82X299 (PCH X299), intended for enthusiasts making use of Intel Core i9 76-79XX processors but it is compatible with LGA 2066 Xeons.

Cannon Point

Cannon Point is the codename of a PCH in Intel 300 Series chipsets, most closely associated with Coffee Lake processors with LGA 1151 socket.

The following variants are available:
 FH82H310 (PCH H310) Desktop Home
 FH82H370 (PCH H370) Desktop Home
 FH82Z370 (PCH Z370) Combined desktop base and home
 FH82B370 (PCH B360) Desktop Office
 FH82Q370 (PCH Q370) Desktop Office
 FH82HM370 (PCH HM370) Mobile Home
 FH82QM370 (PCH QM370) Mobile Office
 FH82CM246 (PCH CM246) Mobile Workstation

Comet Lake PCH

Rocket Lake PCH

See also
 List of Intel chipsets
 Intel Management Engine (ME)
 I/O Controller Hub (ICH)
 PCI IDE ISA Xcelerator (PIIX)
 System Controller Hub (SCH)
 Embedded controller (EC)

References

Intel products
Intel chipsets